Leandro Teófilo Santos Pinto (born May 3, 1981) is a Brazilian football player who plays as a midfielder.

He was recently playing for Malaysia Premier League club Sime Darby F.C., which he joined in April 2012. He was released at the end of the season.

Before joining Sime Darby, he played for Armenian club Gandzasar F.C. He also has played for clubs in Vietnam, Sweden, Albania as well as his native Brazil. Now he plays in Sweden for the division three club IFK Åmål in Dalsland, Västra Götaland.

References

External links

Brazilian footballers
1981 births
Living people
Brazilian expatriate sportspeople in Vietnam
KF Vllaznia Shkodër players
Expatriate footballers in Albania
Association football midfielders
Expatriate footballers in Vietnam
Brazilian expatriate footballers
Östersunds FK players
Armenian Premier League players
Footballers from Rio de Janeiro (city)